John Niklasson (6 June 1923, Öddö – 24 September 2006, Stromstad) was a Swedish rower. He was a member of Sweden's men's eights team at the 1952 Summer Olympics.

References

1923 births
2006 deaths
Swedish male rowers
Rowers at the 1952 Summer Olympics
Olympic athletes of Sweden